Ainslie Thomas Henderson (born 28 January 1979, Edinburgh, Scotland) is a Scottish singer-songwriter and animator. He became known to the public via his appearance on the BBC's television programme, Fame Academy, and his subsequent UK top 5 single, "Keep Me a Secret". In 2006, he independently released his debut album, Growing Flowers by Candlelight. He later became a film writer and animator, earning a BAFTA for co-writing and animating the film The Making of Longbird.

Fame Academy
In 2002, Henderson appeared in the first series of the BBC talent/reality show Fame Academy, where he was a crowd favourite. During his time at the Academy, he became known for his energetic performances as well as being a songwriter. He wrote "Keep Me a Secret" with Malachi Cush and Sinéad Quinn and "Take Out Time" with Mark Hunter and Saul Davies of James, as well as co-writing "Lullaby" with Lemar Obika. All three tracks would later reach the top 5 in the UK Singles Chart, the latter two as B-sides.  He was voted off the show in the penultimate week, coming fourth.

After his departure from the show, he was signed to Mercury and, in March 2003, released a solo single of "Keep Me a Secret" with "Take Out Time" as the B-side, which entered the UK Singles Chart at No. 5.

Henderson became unhappy with the direction his musical career was taking with Mercury.  In late 2003, before releasing the album or a second single, Henderson was dropped. Although he was allowed to retain the rights of the songs he had already written and recorded, they have never been released.  He revealed one track, "Coming Up for Air", on his MySpace profile in 2006. This has since been released officially as a download only track.

Collaborations
Prior to Fame Academy, Henderson had been a member of the rock band Suburbia, with guitarist Peter Deane, Alasdair Crooks (bass), Chris Plews (guitar) and Simon Usher (drums). Forming in 1998, they had just secured a recording contract with the Los Angeles record label City of Angels when the label went bankrupt, and although the band continued to perform together, they split in 2002. One of their songs, "Always", appeared on the soundtrack of football simulation video game, FIFA 2004.

In 2004, he visited the US, collaborating with the American singer-songwriter Jason Mraz, and co-writing the song "Clockwatching" which appears on Mraz's album, Mr. A-Z.

Later that year, he returned to his home city, joining the rock band The Last September as guitarist and backing vocalist, along with his friend Pete Deane from Suburbia. They performed in London and at several venues in Scotland. He left The Last September in 2005.

Debut album
After a three-year break from his solo career, Henderson revealed new material to the public for the first time with the creation of a Myspace profile in early 2006, featuring new tracks "Day Trip" and "While They Wait".  He performed a number of new songs whilst supporting Unkle Bob on several gigs around central Scotland in the following months. Henderson released his debut album, Growing Flowers by Candlelight, on 15 July 2006, on his own  label, Amphibian Husbandry.

In May 2007, Henderson supported Marillion on two dates during their UK tour.

In 2013, he worked with Shane Filan in Ireland.

Discography

Albums
Growing Flowers by Candlelight (July 2006), Amphibian Husbandry

Singles
"Keep Me a Secret" (March 2003), Mercury - UK No. 5
"Coming Up for Air" (June 2007), Amphibian Husbandry

Films
Ainslie won a BAFTA in 2013 for co-writing and animating the film The Making of Longbird, and was nominated for his directorial work in I Am Tom Moody in 2014. He made the animated video for the single "Moving On" by the band James, released in 2014.

References

External links
Ainslie Henderson Official website
Growing Flowers by Candlelight on Last.fm
Ainslie Henderson on IAC
Mono the Movie
FeltusFeltus
Interview in The Daily Record July 15 2006
Interview in the Edinburgh Evening News March 23 2007

1979 births
Living people
Scottish pop singers
Scottish singer-songwriters
Musicians from Edinburgh
21st-century Scottish singers